Månkarbo is a locality situated in Tierp Municipality, Uppsala County, Sweden with 666 inhabitants in 2010.

References 

Populated places in Uppsala County
Populated places in Tierp Municipality